Martinat is a surname. Notable people with the surname include:

Giulio Martinat (1891–1943), Italian general
Ugo Martinat (1942–2009), Italian politician

See also
Martina (given name)
Martinas